Andrew Grant Lawson (born 4 March 1967) is a South African former cricketer. He played in 62 first-class and 37 List A matches from 1990/91 to 2000/01.

References

External links
 

1967 births
Living people
South African cricketers
Border cricketers
Eastern Province cricketers
Marylebone Cricket Club cricketers
North West cricketers
Cricketers from Durban